Yakovlev Yak-45 was the designation for a series of design studies in 1973-1974 for a single-seat fighter. It lost to the Mikoyan MiG-29.

Design and development
In the early 1970s the Soviet VVS expressed a desire to replace the MiG-21 with a more modern twin-engine fighter with greater air-superiority capabilities. Yakovlev's entry was a series of designs submitted under the designation Yak-45.

The Yak-45 would have been powered by two Favorski Type 69 non-vectoring turbofan engines with afterburners. Derived from the R-28, they were rated at 8,000 kg (17,635 lb) thrust each. The engines would have been positioned ahead of a large delta wing, with an additional large canard foreplane, giving the aircraft an appearance similar to the Saab Viggen.

The design was rejected in favor of the MiG-29.

In 1978-1979 Yakovlev attempted to restart development of the Yak-45 by designing a V/STOL version with two vectoring-thrust nozzles and two RD-38 jets. This aircraft was not developed because the problem of roll associated with the loss of one engine during VTOL operation was never solved.

See also
 Mikoyan MiG-29
 Saab Viggen

References

 Gunston, Bill. Yakovlev Aircraft since 1924. London, UK: Putnam Aeronautical Books, 1997. .

External links

Abandoned military aircraft projects of the Soviet Union
Canard aircraft
Delta-wing aircraft
Yak-045
VTOL aircraft
Aircraft with auxiliary jet engines